The 1982 Labatt Brier, the Canadian men's curling championship was held from March 7 to 14, 1982 at the Keystone Centre in Brandon, Manitoba. The total attendance for the week was 106,394, which was the first Brier to be attended by over 100,000 spectators.

After losing in the Brier final the previous two years, Al Hackner, who skipped Team Northern Ontario finally captured the Brier tankard in the third straight final appearance after defeating British Columbia, skipped by Brent Giles in the final 7–3. Northern Ontario advanced to the final after defeating Manitoba 8–5 in the semifinal. This was Northern Ontario's third Brier championship and the first of two titles skipped by Hackner.

The Hackner rink would go onto represent Canada in the 1982 Air Canada Silver Broom, the men's world curling championship held in Garmisch-Partenkirchen, Germany which they captured the world championship as well.

Manitoba's 6–5 victory over New Brunswick in Draw 2 and British Columbia's 7–6 victory over Northern Ontario in Draw 12 were the sixth and seventh instances in which a game went into a second extra end in the Brier.

Teams
The teams were listed as follows:

Round-robin standings
Final Round Robin standings

Round-robin results
All draw times are listed in Central Standard Time (UTC-06:00).

Draw 1
Sunday, March 7, 1:00 pm

Draw 2
Sunday, March 7, 7:30 pm

Draw 3
Monday, March 8, 9:00 am

Draw 4
Monday, March 8, 1:30 pm

Draw 5
Monday, March 8, 7:30 pm

Draw 6
Tuesday, March 9, 9:00 am

Draw 7
Tuesday, March 9, 1:30 pm

Draw 8
Tuesday, March 9, 7:30 pm

Draw 9
Wednesday, March 10, 9:00 am

Draw 10
Wednesday, March 10, 1:30 pm

Draw 11
Wednesday, March 10, 7:30 pm

Draw 12
Thursday, March 11, 1:30 pm

Draw 13
Thursday, March 11, 7:30 pm

Draw 14
Friday, March 12, 9:00 am

Draw 15
Friday, March 12, 1:30 pm

Tiebreakers
Manitoba was awarded the bye into the second tiebreaker round based on head-to-head victories over both New Brunswick and Newfoundland in the round robin.

Round 1
Friday, March 12, 7:30 pm

Round 2
Saturday, March 13, 9:00 am

Playoffs

Semifinal
Saturday, March 13, 1:45 pm

Final
Sunday, March 14, 12:45 pm

Awards

All-Star Team 
The media selected the following curlers as All-Stars.

Ross G.L. Harstone Award
The Ross Harstone Award was presented to the player chosen by their fellow peers as the curler who best represented Harstone's high ideals of good sportsmanship, observance of the rules, exemplary conduct and curling ability.

References

Labatt
Labatt
The Brier
Labatt Brier
Labatt Brier